Walts Cliff is a rock cliff that is conspicuous from a great distance, marking the base of Mount Berlin at the northeast side, in the Flood Range of Marie Byrd Land. Mapped by United States Geological Survey (USGS) from ground surveys and U.S. Navy air photos, 1959–66. Named by Advisory Committee on Antarctic Names (US-ACAN) for Dennis S. Walts of the U.S. Weather Bureau, meteorologist at South Pole Station, 1970.

References 

Cliffs of Marie Byrd Land
Flood Range